John Ferrers (died 1622) was an English merchant, landowner and politician who sat in the House of Commons from 1621 to 1622.

Ferrers was the son of Roger Ferrers of Fiddington Gloucestershire and his wife Margaret Badger. He was a mercer of London. In 1621, he was elected Member of Parliament for Tamworth.
 
Ferrers died before October 1622 when his will was proved.

Ferrers was the father of Sir Henry Ferrers, 1st Baronet.

References

Year of birth missing
1622 deaths
English MPs 1621–1622
English merchants
17th-century merchants
17th-century English businesspeople